A car spotter is a person who is typically strongly interested, in an amateur capacity, in car spotting, which is observing or photographing interesting, vintage, rare, modified, sport cars and exotic supercars on public roads, streets, garages, meets... Car spotters can be found worldwide.

A car spotter may also log about his or her "spots" on an internet forum, such as ExoticSpotter  & Autogespot,  or various groups on Facebook.

Car spotters can often be found in large, wealthy cities and areas such as London, Paris, Milan, Dubai, Geneva, Monaco, Tokyo, New York City, and Miami where exotic cars and exotic car shows are most commonly found/held.

Car spotters usually carry a DSLR camera and rely on social media to direct them to the nearest "spot".

See also
 People watching

References

Further reading

John Dudley (1952) ABC of motor car spotting
Greenwood Graeme (1949) ABC of Motor Car Spotting 1935-1948

Spotting
Observation hobbies